The Ghoul is a 1975 British Tyburn Film Productions horror film directed by Freddie Francis and starring Peter Cushing, John Hurt, Alexandra Bastedo, Veronica Carlson, Gwen Watford, Don Henderson and Ian McCulloch. In the United States, the film was released as Night Of The Ghoul and The Thing In The Attic.

Plot

In 1920s England, a group of upper-class people take part in an automobile race to Land’s End. One couple, Daphne and Billy, get lost in a heavy fog and run out of petrol. Billy goes to look for fuel, but takes so long that Daphne strikes out on her own. She locates a rural estate run by Dr. Lawrence, a former priest. He receives her kindly and sends his disturbed gardener, Tom, to find Billy. Tom finds Billy asleep in the car and kills him by pushing the car with him inside over a ravine. It is implied that he acted on his master’s orders. 

Meanwhile, Lawrence tells Daphne about a trip his family took to India; his experience with certain cults there horrified him so much that he renounced religion in general. This decision was heavily influenced by the fate of his wife and son, who were converted to a new faith by a local nobleman. The former was afterwards so horrified by the things she had done that she committed suicide. 

Still waiting for Billy, Daphne falls asleep in a guest room. Seeing this, the doctor’s Indian housekeeper, Ayah, goes to the attic and lets out a bloated, blood-stained man in a priest’s mantle. He kills Daphne with a katar, and Ayah ritually cooks the girl’s flesh for him to eat and burns the girl’s clothes. 

The first couple’s friends, Geoffrey and Angela, learn of Billy’s death from the local police and set out on a private mission to find Daphne. They too wreck their car and are separated in the search for help. The police refuse to search the marshlands as it is too dangerous. Angela locates the Lawrence estate and is abducted by Tom, who obliviously tries to rape her. When Lawrence discovers her presence, he reluctantly decides to use her as another sacrifice to the ghoul in his attic. Angela is saved from molestation when Tom is sent to get rid of Geoffrey, who found the estate first and was convinced by Lawrence that Angela and Daphne were safely escorted back into town. 

Tom botches his attempt to kill Geoffrey and is half-sucked into a bog in his attempt to flee. Before he is rescued, he is ordered to explain himself. Tom admits that Daphne was fed to something living in Lawrence’s house. Geoffrey returns to the estate and confronts Lawrence, who admits that the ghoul is his own son; the man has been a cannibal since his conversion, and Ayah is another cult member who came from India to prepare his food. Lawrence has tended to and taken care of his son because he promised his wife he would do so. 

Geoffrey barges into the attic and confronts the ghoul, who kills him. Meanwhile, Tom sneaks into the room where Angela is imprisoned and tries again to rape her, but is interrupted and killed by the ghoul, who has gone out of control. The creature attacks Angela, but Lawrence enters with a pistol and fatally wounds it. Angela runs screaming from the house. Heartbroken by what has happened, Lawrence goes into his study and shoots himself through the head.

Cast
 Peter Cushing as Doctor  Lawrence
 John Hurt as Tom Rawlings
 Alexandra Bastedo as Angela
 Veronica Carlson as Daphne Wells Hunter
 Gwen Watford as Ayah
 Don Henderson as The Ghoul
 Ian McCulloch as Geoffrey 
 Stewart Bevan as Billy
 John D. Collins as “Young Man”
 Dan Meaden as Police Sergeant

Production
This was the second film produced by Tyburn Film Productions. It was shot on location at Pinewood Studios, Iver Heath, Buckinghamshire, England from 4 March 1974. While the film was in production, actor Peter Cushing went through emotional turmoil: before he signed on to do this film, he lost his beloved wife Helen to natural causes, leading him to wish he would die himself and soon. According to co-star Veronica Carlson, director Freddie Francis made Cushing do multiple takes during the scene where he talks about his love for his late wife. This caused Cushing great distress and reduced the widowed actor and some of the crew to tears. Cushing played other men who lost family members in other horror films in the 1970s, including the 1972 film Asylum and the 1973 film The Creeping Flesh.

Reception
Variety praised the "assured acting" and "impressive set decoration" but called the film "far too tame for its own good," with a script that "moves from A to Z without generating much excitement and surprise in between." Geoff Brown of The Monthly Film Bulletin wrote that the revelation of the titular character near the end was "hardly worth the wait," and that "only John Hurt injects more than a fraction of life into his character and dialogue."

TV Guide gave the film two stars out of four, writing that "Cushing and other familiar Hammer faces give this the old college try, but Francis' dull direction--endless shots of Henderson's legs creeping down the stairs--makes the cause hopeless."

References

External links

 

1975 horror films
1975 films
British horror films
Films set in Cornwall
Films set in country houses
Films shot at Pinewood Studios
Films directed by Freddie Francis
Films about cannibalism
1970s English-language films
1970s British films